Love and Death in Bali (German: Liebe und Tod auf Bali) is a 1937 novel by the Austrian writer Vicki Baum. It is set during the 1906 Dutch intervention in Bali. Baum had recently stayed in Bali with her friend Walter Spies who supplied her with background for the novel. It is also known by the title A Tale from Bali.

References

Bibliography
 Rubinstein, Raechelle & Conner, Linda H. Staying Local in the Global Village: Bali in the Twentieth Century. University of Hawaii Press, 1999.

Austrian novels
1937 American novels
Novels by Vicki Baum
Novels set in Bali
Austrian historical novels
Novels set in the 1900s